DSC Arminia Bielefeld (full name:  ;  commonly known as Arminia Bielefeld, also known as Die Arminen  or Die Blauen ), or just Arminia, is a German sports club from Bielefeld, North Rhine-Westphalia. Arminia offers the sports of football, field hockey, figure skating, and cue sports. The club has 12,000 members and the club colours are black, white and blue. Arminia's name derives from the Cheruscan chieftain Arminius, who defeated a Roman army in the Battle of the Teutoburg Forest.

The club is most commonly known for its professional football team, which currently plays in the 2. Bundesliga. The team mostly played in the first or second tier of the German football league system, among them 17 seasons in the Bundesliga. Arminia's most successful years were the 1920s, the early 1980s and the middle 2000s. In 1947 and in the 1950s Arminia had sunk down to a team playing in a rather local area in the third tier (later third tiers covered larger areas).

Arminia has been playing their home games at the Bielefelder Alm Stadium since 1926. Since 2004 the stadium has been named SchücoArena through a sponsorship deal.

History

Arminia Bielefeld was founded on 3 May 1905 as 1. Bielefelder FC Arminia. The fourteen men who founded the club were from the local bourgeoisie. Two weeks later, the club played its first match against a team from Osnabrück. Neither the name of the opponent nor the result are known. The club was admitted to the German Football Association in the same year and started to play in a league (in one consisting only of Arminia and three teams from Osnabrück, at first) in 1906. In 1907, local rivals FC Siegfried joined Arminia, a move which strengthened Arminia's squad. Soon other clubs from Bielefeld joined League football.

After playing on various grounds, Arminia moved to a new home at the Pottenau in 1910. Their first big achievement came in 1912, when they won the Westphalian championship after a 5–1 win over BV 04 Dortmund in the final. The outbreak of World War I interrupted Arminia's rise to the top. In 1919, Arminia merged with Bielefelder Turngemeinde 1848 to form TG Arminia Bielefeld. However, the two merged teams dissolved the merger in 1922 and both parent clubs were formed again.

1922–1945
Arminia won the West German championship in 1922. Originally, they were level on points with Kölner BC 01, but Köln fielded an ineligible player in one match. Arminia played for the first time in the German Championships but were eliminated in the quarter-finals after losing 0–5 to FC Wacker München. In 1923, Arminia won their second West German championship in a dramatic way. They trailed TuRU Düsseldorf 1–3 at half time of the final, but came from behind to win 4–3 after extra time. Arminia faced Union Oberschöneweide in the quarter-finals of the German championships. The match ended goalless, so a replay was held. Arminia led 1–0 and suffered the equalizer in injury time. The Berlin side won the match after extra time. Walter Claus-Oehler became Arminia's first player to win a cap in the German national team. Arminia won further Westphalian titles from 1924 to 1927 but were unable to repeat their success in the West German Championships. A match between SC Preußen Münster and Arminia in November 1925 was the first football match to be broadcast on German Radio. On 30 January 1926, the club took its current name Deutscher Sportclub Arminia Bielefeld. Their next piece of silverware was won in 1932 with a triumph in the Westphalian cup.

In 1933, Arminia qualified for the Gauliga Westfalen, from which they were relegated after the inaugural season. Three attempts of gaining promotion failed before their return to the top flight was won in 1938. Their best performance in the Gauliga was the 1939–40 campaign, where Arminia finished second. Two years later, Arminia was one of only two teams to win a match at Schalke 04. On 25 July 1943 Arminia merged with local rivals VfB 03 Bielefeld. The merger finished the 1943–44 season in last place.

Post World War II

After World War II, a new league with all teams who competed in the Gauliga Westfalen was formed. Arminia were relegated and failed to win re-promotion. In 1947–48, Arminia were a third division side for the first time in their history. After a dominating season in the Bezirksklasse, Arminia was docked 14 points because they fielded an ineligible player. The next season was already under way when the Landesliga (II) was expanded by two teams. Arminia took their chance, won the league and gained promotion to the Oberliga West.

The dream lasted for only a year. Arminia beat Schalke 04 4–2 at home but finished only second from the bottom. In 1954, Arminia were even relegated to the third tier, the "Landesliga Westfalen, Gruppe Ostwestfalen", a league only covering the north-eastern part of Westphalia. In 1956, Arminia qualified for a new third tier, the "Verbandsliga Westfalen, Gruppe Ostwestfalen", which encompassed a slightly larger area. Only in 1962, Arminia became a second division side again (then: 2. Liga West, covering the whole of North Rhine-Westphalia). In 1962–63, they struggled to finish in seventh place to secure a spot in the newly formed Regionalliga West, which was situated directly below the new Bundesliga.

Arminia finished their first seasons in mid-table, but became one of the better Regionalliga teams later on. In 1966, Arminia beat Alemannia Aachen to claim the West German Cup for the first time. A year later, forward Ernst Kuster joined the team and went on to become the club's all-time leading goal scorer (more than half a century later, Fabian Klos would beat his record). A 0–1 loss to Wuppertaler SV on the last day of the 1966–67 season stopped Arminia entering the Bundesliga promotion play-offs. Arminia were runners-up in the 1969–70 season and won their first promotion to the Bundesliga after a 2–0 win at Tennis Borussia Berlin in the play-offs.

The 1970s

The team had a poor start in their first Bundesliga season, but results improved and they eventually finished 14th. However, near the end of the season it was discovered that Arminia had engaged in match-fixing; three of the ten Bundesliga games which were proven to have been manipulated through bribery directly involved Arminia. Two players at the club were banned from football for life (Waldemar Slomiany and Jürgen Neumann). Arminia was allowed to play the 1971–72 season in the Bundesliga, but were automatically relegated to the Regionalliga as a penalty. Arminia struggled in the following seasons, but were good enough to be appointed to the newly formed 2. Bundesliga in 1974.

After two seasons in mid-table, Arminia had good chances of returning to the Bundesliga in 1976–77 but they finished only as runner-up behind FC St. Pauli. They faced TSV 1860 München in a two-legged play-off whose winner would win promotion to the top flight. Arminia won the first match at home 4–0, but lost the second leg in Munich 0–4. A third match had to be played in Frankfurt which Munich won 2–0.

The team was shocked but bounced back to win promotion in 1977–78. Arminia started well and on 10 March 1979, they won 4–0 at Bayern Munich. However, Arminia were hit by a slump and were relegated again. The club managed to keep the team together and bounced back after a record-breaking 1979–80 season. They won 30 of 38 matches, scored 120 goals, had a 28 match unbeaten streak and set a league record by beating Arminia Hannover 11–0.

Five consecutive seasons in Bundesliga and decline (1980–1993)

Arminia struggled to avoid relegation and managed to stay in the Bundesliga for five years, including two finishes in eighth place in 1982–83 and 1983–84 seasons. Furthermore, Arminia took part in the UEFA Intertoto Cup three times. An ugly event shocked Germany when Werder Bremen defender Norbert Siegmann slashed Ewald Lienen's right thigh during a match. The success on the pitch did not prevent the club from suffering declining attendances which enlarged the financial problems. In 1984–85, Arminia finished third from the bottom and lost the relegation play-offs against 1. FC Saarbrücken.

The team failed to gain promotion and in the fall of 1987, Arminia had debts of 4.5 million Marks. The result was a last place finish in 1987–88. Ernst Middendorp became the new manager and assembled a young team for the new season. Arminia led the way in the Oberliga Westfalen but finished only second in 1988–89. They won the Oberliga a year later, but failed in the promotion play-offs to VfB Oldenburg and TSV Havelse. Four dismal seasons followed in which the team started well but were unable to compete for the championship. In 1991, Arminia won the Westphalian Cup, a cup for Westphalian amateur teams, and beat FSV Mainz 05 in the first round of the DFB-Pokal.

Resurgence and years as a yo-yo-team (1994–2004)
In the spring of 1994, Arminia created a relatively large media buzz by signing veteran Bundesliga players like Thomas von Heesen, Armin Eck and Fritz Walter. Arminia struggled at first but went on the become champions of the newly formed Regionalliga West/Südwest and runners-up in the 1995–96 2. Bundesliga. Arminia signed Stefan Kuntz for the 1996–97 Bundesliga season, their first in 11 years and finished in 14th position.

The club wrote German football history by signing Iranian players Ali Daei and Karim Bagheri along with the SK Brann icon Geirmund Brendesæter, who enjoyed a brief spell with the club in 1997. However, after a poor run after the winter break, Arminia were relegated shortly after Brendesæter had left the club. They bounced back by winning the 1998–99 season. Bruno Labbadia became the league's top scorer with 28 goals. The club suffered from financial problems and entered the 1999–2000 season with a smaller budget. Relegation followed again after the team became the third team in Bundesliga history to lose ten matches in a row.

Arminia struggled against relegation again the next season and avoided to drop into the Regionalliga in close season. Their fortunes turned around and Arminia won their sixth promotion to the Bundesliga in 2001–02 with Artur Wichniarek scoring 18 goals. Arminia were almost saved the next year but a slump with only two points out of the last six matches sealed relegation again.

Once again: Five consecutive seasons in Bundesliga and decline (2004–2011)
The team bounced back again in 2003–04 after Ghanaian striker Isaac Boakye scored 14 goals in his debut season to end as the club's top goalscorer and help them go back to the Bundesliga. They were able to stay in the top flight until 2009. In 2004–05, Patrick Owomoyela became Arminia's new record national player. Delron Buckley scored 15 goals in the Bundesliga matches but left after the season, too. In the DFB-Pokal, Arminia reached the semi-finals in 2005 and 2006. In both seasons, Arminia also kept away from the relegation zone virtually the whole time (except the season's beginnings). In those years the image campaign "Aktion 5000 +" let the number of members rise above 10,000. In 2007, many Arminia fans were sad to see the old East Stand being torn down (then the last non-seater stand in the Bundesliga not being placed behind one of the goals) and also further marketing attempts alienated the fans from the Club's Management Board. 

Season by season, important players of the 2004-05 and the 2005-06 season left (some of them after a decline in their own performance): Fatmir Vata and Heiko Westermann in 2007, Mathias Hain, Sibusiso Zuma and Petr Gabriel in 2008. From 2007 onwards, managerial sackings became more and more common and avoiding relegation became more and more difficult. 

The 2006–07 season was the first one in which Arminia was already close to relegation but after having won four matches from the 30th to the 33rd matchday being coached by Ernst Middendorp, they finished it even better than the two previous ones. In the 2007–08 season, even though it began very well, they gathered only 34 points and avoided relegation merely because 1. FC Nürnberg lost at home during Arminia's draw against VfB Stuttgart on the last matchday.  But Arminia finished the 2008–09 season last and were relegated to the 2. Bundesliga. In the 2009–10 season important players of the former seasons like Rüdiger Kauf, Dennis Eilhoff, Jonas Kamper and Radim Kučera were still part of the squad. On 16 March 2010, Arminia was deducted four points by the DFL for breaches of the licensing regulations. This greatly reduced their chances of promotion. The financial situation worsened, especially because the costs for the new construction of the East Stand had turned out much higher than originally planned in 2007. They finished the season 7th and many important players left the club. The coach, the managing director and the club's president were replaced in the summer break. Nevertheless, the 2010-11 season started very bad, so that in November, the coach Christian Ziege war replaced by club legend Ewald Lienen. However, in spite of signing several new players during the rest of the season they picked up only 16 points and won only four games, so that they ended the season on the last rank and were relegated to the 3. Liga. Even more players left.

3. Liga, interrupted once (2011–2015)

A new team had to be formed with players formerly unknown in Bielefeld who would leave their mark on the following seasons: Patrick Platins, Manuel Hornig, Tom Schütz, Sebastian Hille, Thomas Hübener, Patrick Schönfeld, Johannes Rahn and from the second half of the season onwards especially Fabian Klos who would coin a whole era. Another formative player, Stefan Ortega Moreno, joined from the club's youth. After a poor start, they ended the 2011–12 season in 13th place. They also won the Westphalia Cup in a final against arch rival SC Preußen Münster. By reaching the final, they also qualified for the 2012–13 DFB-Pokal, where they beat SC Paderborn 07, a team playing in the 2. Bundesliga, but lost in the second round in a close match against Bayer 04 Leverkusen, a Europa League participant. On 11 May 2013, Bielefeld beat VfL Osnabrück 1–0 to guarantee a top two finish and promotion back to the 2. Bundesliga for the 2013–14 season. 

That season began quite hopeful: Arminia qualified for the second round of the DFB-Pokal again and at the 8th matchday they had even climbed up to the 3rd rank in the league table. But after a disastrous autumn and a mediocre winter Arminia fell down onto the 17th rank and the popular coach Stefan Krämer – the first manager having held office for more than two years since 2004 – had to leave. His successor Norbert Meier at first had only little more success: Arminia finished 16th in the 2. Bundesliga, and lost a playoff against SV Darmstadt 98 on away goals after a 122nd minute (extra time) goal gave Darmstadt the victory. Arminia had to go back into the 3. Liga.

But the next season could wipe out the bitterness of that disaster: In the 2014–15 DFB-Pokal, as a 3. Liga club, Arminia reached the semi-finals by defeating three Bundesliga teams (Hertha BSC, SV Werder Bremen and VfL Borussia Mönchengladbach). They also were the top team in the 3. Liga (after a bad beginning with only four points from the first four matches) for most part of the season. After the loss against VfL Wolfsburg in the semi-final of the DFB-Pokal, Arminia seemed to have lost their ability to win their matches in the 3. Liga as well. Even the qualification for the 2. Bundesliga seemed to become doubtful, but was secured after a 2–2 draw against SSV Jahn Regensburg, the last team in the league table, at the 37th matchday. Liberated from the pressure of a possible non-qualification, they also won the 3. Liga with a final 1–0 victory at the last matchday.

Five consecutive seasons in 2. Bundesliga / financial consolidation (2015–2020)
A stable season with a defeat in the first round of the DFB-Pokal, a lot of draws in the league (especially in the beginning: eight out of ten matches; in the end Arminia reached a record of 18) and only very few goals scored at home (only eight until the 30th matchday) followed so that the 4–2 over Greuther Fürth at the 31st matchday which secured Arminia's staying up was only Arminia's third win at home. That season's highlights probably were the draws against all three top teams away. In the league table Arminia never went deeper than rank 14 and finished 12th.

After the season, the coach Norbert Meier was bought by SV Darmstadt 98. A difficult 2016–17 season with two manager sackings followed. Arminia found themselves among the lowest four teams in the league table from the fourth matchday onwards, mostly on the 16th or 17th rank. On the other hand, Arminia reached the quarter final in the DFB-Pokal. They avoided relegation as they finished in 15th after a 6–0 win over promotion candidate Eintracht Braunschweig and a 1–1 against Dynamo Dresden at the last two matchdays.

The 2017–18 season turned out easier. Having gathered 10 points out of the first four matches, Arminia hardly ever left the upper half of the league table (only at the 19th matchday: rank 10) and finished on the 4th rank – though in that season's very close league table this never meant much. In that season, Arminia also made a big step in lowering its debts through an alliance of sponsors and Fabian Klos replaced Ernst Kuster as the club's all-time top scorer.

In November 2018, Arminia were practically free of debt but had to sell its stadium. The team faced a more difficult situation when December started: Having gained less than one point per match on average, only the weakness of the competing relegation candidates kept them up and they were already out of the DFB-Pokal after a 0–3 defeat at home against MSV Duisburg – another relegation candidate – in the second round. Thus, the popular coach Jeff Saibene was replaced by Uwe Neuhaus who managed to bring back Arminia back into mid table within four matchdays and into 7th place by the last matchday.

The 2019–20 season would turn out even better. When Arminia had climbed on the 3rd rank of the league table after a 2–0 victory away against Hannover 96 – who were originally regarded as a promotion candidate – at the 6th matchday, hardly anyone guessed they would stay in the promotion area of the league table for the rest of the season. They had just reached the second rank of the league table when they met FC Schalke 04 in the 2nd round of the DFB-Pokal on 29 October. In spite of Schalke clearly dominating the match in the first 70 minutes, Arminia thrilled the supporters in the last 20 minutes by scoring two goals and only closely missing extra time. They finished the 15th matchday on 1 December on the first rank of the league table where they would stay for the rest of the season in spite of competing with Hamburger SV and VfB Stuttgart who were originally estimated as main promotion candidates. After Arminia's 1–1 draw in Stuttgart on 9 March 2020 (25th matchday) the season was interrupted because of the COVID-19 pandemic. Even this interruption didn't affect them: they finished the season with 68 points – 10 points more than VfB Stuttgart who finished 2nd.

The 2020s
In the 2020–21 season, they were the team with the lowest budget in the Bundesliga. After a defeat in the first round of the DFB-Pokal they had a quite promising start in the Bundesliga season, but from the 4th matchday onwards they could be found among the last five teams in the league table, from the 6th matchday onwards amongst the last four teams. In March, the popular manager Uwe Neuhaus was replaced by Frank Kramer. A 2–0 win over VfB Stuttgart on the final matchday secured the 15th rank and thus their spot in the 2021–22 Bundesliga. 

That season turned out even more difficult. At the end of October they were in danger of even losing touch to the 16th rank. They started November with 1-0 win away over VfB Stuttgart, their first win in the whole Bundesliga season. That match sort of stabilized Arminia's performance. In February they even climbed up to the 14th rank after a 1-0 win over 1. FC Union Berlin. But this match was the last win in the season. They ended it on the 17th rank, which meant relegation to the 2. Bundesliga.

Colours and crest
Arminia took the club colours blue, white and black upon their foundation in 1905. The colours haven't changed though the current club colours are black, white and blue. Despite this, Arminia played their first match in an orange kit. Arminia's home kit was blue for most of the time while their shorts and socks were white. The team that won promotion to the Bundesliga in 1970 wore a blue shirt with thick white stripes. The away kit was mostly all white while green shirts were worn in the 1990s.

The crest consists of a flag with the club's colours black, white and blue from left to right. The white part of the flag includes the letter A for Arminia. The flag is surrounded by a wreath of oak.

Stadium

Arminia played their first home matches at the Kesselbrink in downtown Bielefeld. They moved to a new ground at the Kaiserstraße (today: August-Bebel-Straße) in 1907 and to the Pottenau in 1910. In 1926, Arminia leased a ground from a farmer named Lohmann. The ground didn't look like a football pitch. The club member Heinrich Pahl said that the area looks like an Alm (German for alpine grassland). The stadium was known as the Alm. Arminia played its first match against Victoria Hamburg on 1 May 1926. The first grandstands were constructed in 1954. When Arminia won promotion to the Bundesliga in 1970, the Alm underwent a general development. A main stand with seats was built and the northern and eastern stands were enlarged. The Alm had a capacity of 30,000 and floodlights were installed. In 1978, a roof was added to the main stands and the other stands were enlarged again. The stadium had a capacity of 35,000 then.

When Arminia was relegated to the Oberliga in 1988, the northern and the southern stand were torn down because both stands didn't match the new safety regulations. The eastern stand was also made smaller and a roof was added. The capacity was reduced to about 15,000. After Arminia won promotion to the Bundesliga in 1996, the main and northern stands were demolished and completely rebuilt. The same happened to the south stand in 1999. In 2004, Arminia signed a sponsorship deal with Schüco and the stadium was named SchücoArena. The latest redevelopment saw the Eastern Stand being rebuilt in 2008.

The Bielefelder Alm has a capacity of 27,300, including 20,381 seats. Bielefelder Alm was a candidate to host matches of the 2011 FIFA Women's World Cup.

Supporters

Arminia have a large number of loyal supporters. Even in 2011–12, Arminia had an average attendance of 8,930 which was the highest in the 3. Liga. In 2014–15, Arminia had an average attendance of 14,540 which was the second highest in that 3. Liga season. The numbers also show the risen popularity of the 3. Liga. Arminias matches during the 2013–14 2. Bundesliga were attended by 16,890 on average. These numbers only count league matches. Arminia's matches in the 2014–15 DFB-Pokal were attended by 21,763 on average. The core of the fans can be found on the terraces of the Southern Stand.

Arminia's fans come primarily from the Ostwestfalen-Lippe region with a catchment area of about 100 kilometers around Bielefeld. There are around 140 fanclubs, mostly from Ostwestfalen-Lippe. However, there are fanclubs in Berlin, Stuttgart, London, Birmingham, Taunton, Austria and the Netherlands.

There is a traditional rivalry with SC Preußen Münster. The match against them in March 2012 which was the first one taking place in Bielefeld after nearly 20 years was attended by 21,203 spectators. No other match in the 3. Liga had such a high attendance. One year later the stadium was nearly sold out in that derby. An earlier rival was VfB 03 Bielefeld from the east of Bielefeld, but the rivalry lessened and nowadays friendly matches between Arminia and VfB Fichte Bielefeld, as the club nowadays is called, take place every year. Another rival is VfL Bochum, especially since the late 90s, and there were "fashion rivalries" with other clubs from the Ruhr, because that area also belongs to Westphalia. Some SC Paderborn 07 supporters seem to consider Arminia as their main rival, but Arminia fans are unlikely to feel the same about them. Also the matches against VfL Osnabrück are a small derby (somehow oscillating beetween friendship and rivalry). There are friendly relations to the supporters of the Hamburger SV with both clubs sharing the same colours (black, white and blue) resulting in the chant "Schwarz, weiß, blau – Arminia und der HSV" (Black, white, blue – Arminia and HSV) among supporters of both clubs. For many fans this friendship also involves friendly ties to Hannover 96, whose fans share a friendship with Hamburg as well. All three clubs are sometimes dubbed the "Nordallianz" (Northern Alliance), despite the fact that Bielefeld (other than Hamburg and Hannover) is not located in what is considered Northern Germany.

Players

Current squad

Out on loan

Women's team

100 Year Team
To celebrate the 100th anniversary of the club's formation, a fan poll was taken to determine the club's greatest starting XI, as well as seven substitutes and a manager. The following players were chosen:

Arminia players in national teams
The player who has won the most international caps while at the club (from 1997 to 2000) is Karim Bagheri with 28 for Iran. He and his team-mate Ali Daei were important Iranian players in the 1998 FIFA World Cup. They are the only footballers having taken part in a World Cup's final tournament while playing for Arminia. Other remarkable Arminia players who represented foreign countries while at the club are Pasi Rautiainen, Artur Wichniarek, Markus Weissenberger, Fatmir Vata, Isaac Boakye, Delron Buckley, Sibusiso Zuma, Rowen Fernández, Christopher Katongo, Jonas Kamper, Ritsu Dōan and Alessandro Schöpf. 

Four players were capped by Germany during their time with Arminia: Walter Claus-Oehler in 1923, Stefan Kuntz in 1996, Ronald Maul in 1999 and Patrick Owomoyela in 2004 and 2005. He played six matches for Germany in this time and thus holds the record. Some of the most famous former Arminia players played for their national teams only between their times with Arminia (Uli Stein and Jörg Böhme) or after their years with Arminia (Dieter Burdenski, Thomas Helmer, Arne Friedrich, Heiko Westermann and Jonathan Clauss).

Honours
 Arminia Bielefeld has never won any major trophies, but they have won some silverware on a minor level.

League titles
 2. Bundesliga: (II)
Champions: 1977–78, 1979–80, 1998–99, 2019–20
 3. Liga: (III)
Champions: 2014–15
 Regionalliga West/Südwest: (III)
Champions: 1994–95
 Oberliga Westfalen: (III)
Champions: 1989–90

Regional titles
 Western German football championship
 Winners: 1922, 1923

Cups
 West German cup winner:
 Winners: 1966, 1974
 Westphalian cup winner:
 Winners: 1908, 1932, 1991, 2012, 2013

Coaches

References

External links

 
Football clubs in Germany
Football clubs in North Rhine-Westphalia
Association football clubs established in 1905
Multi-sport clubs in Germany
1905 establishments in Germany
Sport in Bielefeld
Bundesliga clubs
2. Bundesliga clubs
3. Liga clubs